Diane Guérin (4 April 1948 – 18 September 2022), also known as Belgazou, was a Canadian actress and singer.

Biography
Known for her friendly persona, Belgazou became popular in the 1980s for her music, with titles such as "Quitter ton île", "Entre Mozart et Jagger", and "Talk about it". She was frequently lampooned by comedy group Rock et Belles Oreilles. In 1991, she resumed usage of her birth name, Diane Guérin. She began singing in duets with her husband, Christian Montmarquette, under the name Diane et Christian. They performed in bars in Montreal and Quebec City. They also performed in Miami alongside .

Guérin died on 18 September 2022, at the age of 74.

Discography
 Belgazou (1982)
 Fly (1984)
 Les Yeux de la faim (1985)
 Où va la vie (1987)
 J'l'aime encore (1991)

Filmography
 Sol et Gobelet - 1969
 The Doves (Les Colombes) - 1972
 The Swindle (La Gammick) - 1975
 Let's Talk About Love (Parlez-nous d'amour) - 1976
  - 1998

References

External links
 
 

1948 births
2022 deaths
Actresses from Montreal
French Quebecers
People from Lachine, Quebec
Canadian film actresses
Singers from Montreal
20th-century Canadian actresses
20th-century Canadian women singers